Mee-mawing was a form of speech with exaggerated movements to allow lip reading employed by workers in weaving sheds in Lancashire in the nineteenth and twentieth centuries. The noise in a weaving shed rendered hearing impossible so workers communicated by mee-mawing which was a cross between mime and lip reading. To have a private conversation when there were other weavers present, the speaker would cup their hand over their mouth to obscure vision. This was very necessary as a mee-mawer would be able to communicate over distances of tens of yards. It was said that each mill had its own dialect.

The British comedian Hylda Baker used mee-mawing as part of her stage and radio act in the 1950s.

See also
Queen Street Mill

References
Notes

Bibliography

Human communication
Cotton industry
Culture in Lancashire